Zubair Ahmed Siddiqi (5 May 1944 – 28 May 2003), better known as Marc Zuber, was an actor who appeared in many British and Hindi films and television dramas.

Marc Zuber was born Zubair Ahmed Siddiqi on 5 May 1944 in Lucknow, India. He came to Britain with his family in 1951, joining his father who had moved two years earlier as a BBC radio producer. Zuber was brought up in London and went to Harrow Technical College before training as an actor at the Webber Douglas Academy of Dramatic Art.

He left drama school in 1968, changing his name to Marc Zuber on the advice of his agent, and began his acting career in the theatre with seasons at Chester, Bolton, Richmond, the Shaw Theatre, London, and two years at the Royal Shakespeare Company. He appeared in mostly small roles in television and film, including Coronation Street in which he played Mr Khan in 1990, but he also starred in the Hindi films, Yeh Nazdeekiyan (1982) and Kamla (1984), and had a leading role in Qatl (1986).

His film appearances include The Satanic Rites of Dracula, The Wind and the Lion, The Sea Wolves, Shirley Valentine and Robin Hood: Prince of Thieves.
 
Television credits include: The Onedin Line, Doomwatch, The Regiment, The Changes, Space: 1999, Quiller, Blake's 7, The Sweeney, Minder (Aces High – and Sometimes Very Low), Buccaneer, The Enigma Files, The Chinese Detective, The Bill, Holby City and King & Castle.
 
He also worked with Aditya Pancholi and Persis Khambatta in television film Shingora.
 
Zuber died on 28 May 2003, in London, England.

Filmography

1971: A Kiss is Just a Kiss - Radio operator
1973: Penny Gold - Hotel Receptionist 
1973: The Satanic Rites of Dracula - Guard 1
1974: A Private Enterprise - Ashok 
1975: The Wind and the Lion - The Sultan
1976: Black and White in Color - Major Anglais
1976: Space: 1999: Brian the Brain - Security Lieutenant
1978: Sweeney 2 - Andy
1979: Minder - Series 1, Episode 6: Aces High...And Sometimes Very Low - Nick
1980: The Sea Wolves - Ram Das Gupta
1980: The Merchant of Venice - Prince of Morocco
1982: Yeh Nazdeekiyan - Sunil Verma 
1984: Milenge Kabhi
1984: Inteha
1984: Ram Tera Desh - Sub-Inspector Kumar 
1984: Bhavna - Ajay Kapoor 
1984: Kanoon Meri Mutthi Mein
1984: Kamla - Jaisingh Jadhav 
1985: Cricketer
1985: Telephone
1985: Yaar Kasam
1985: Haveli - Insp. Shyam / Pritam
1985: Aurat Pair Ki Juti Nahin Hai
1986: Qatl - Ranjeet 
1986: Foreign Body - Macho escort 
1986: Shingora - Vikram 
1987: Dak Bangla - Ajay 
1987: Aaj - Anjali's Papa
1988: Rukhsat - Gautam Saigal
1988: Main Tere Liye
1988: Ek Naya Rishta - Professor Shekar Verma
1989: Doorie - Vijay Saxena 
1989: Sachché Ká Bol-Bálá - Police Commissioner Pandey 
1989: Shirley Valentine - Renos 
1989: Jism Ka Rishta 
1990: Navy SEALs - Villa Hostage 
1991: Robin Hood: Prince of Thieves - Interrogator 
1991: Khooni Raat 
1997: Divine Lovers - Prince Kabir 
1998: Jinnah - Muhammad Iqbal

References

External links
 

1944 births
2003 deaths
English male film actors
English male television actors
Male actors from Lucknow
Male actors in Hindi cinema
20th-century English male actors